Heritage Valley most commonly refers to:
 Heritage Valley, Edmonton
 Heritage Valley Town Centre, Edmonton
 Santa Clara River Valley, nicknamed "Heritage Valley" by the namesake tourism bureau